Interzone: The 2nd Anthology is an anthology edited by John Clute, Simon Ounsley and David Pringle published in 1987 by Simon & Schuster in the UK and by St. Martins Press in the US.

Plot summary
Interzone: The 2nd Anthology is an anthology that offers 15 selections from Interzone magazine. 
.

Reception
Dave Langford reviewed Interzone: The 2nd Anthology for White Dwarf #94, and stated that "a good sampler if you're one of the pitiful outcasts who don't subscribe."

Reviews
Review by Faren Miller (1987) in Locus, #322 November 1987
Review by Don D'Ammassa (1988) in Science Fiction Chronicle, #101 February 1988
Review by Mike Moir (1988) in Vector 143
Review by Stef Lewicki (1988) in Foundation, #42 Spring 1988

References

1987 anthologies
Science fiction anthologies
Simon & Schuster books